Anthony B. Sumpter (September 13, 1922 – December 9, 2017) was an American football guard who played two seasons with the Chicago Rockets. He played college football at Cameron University, having previously attended Lawton High School in Lawton, Oklahoma.

References

1922 births
2017 deaths
American football guards
Chicago Rockets players
Cameron Aggies football players
Players of American football from Oklahoma
People from Comanche County, Oklahoma